Nicolás Domingo Cotugno Fanizzi, S.D.B. (born 21 September 1938 in Sesto San Giovanni, Province of Milan) is an Italian-Uruguayan Roman Catholic priest.

Early life 
He was the Archbishop of Montevideo from 4 December 1998 till 11 February 2014. Previously he served as Bishop of Melo.

In September 2013 he tendered his resignation to Pope Francis, due to age reasons. He was succeeded by the former Auxiliary Bishop of Montevideo, Daniel Sturla.

References

1938 births
Living people
People from Sesto San Giovanni
Pontifical Gregorian University alumni
Bishops appointed by Pope John Paul II
Salesian bishops
Roman Catholic bishops of Melo
Italian Roman Catholic bishops in South America
20th-century Roman Catholic archbishops in Uruguay
21st-century Roman Catholic archbishops in Uruguay
Uruguayan Roman Catholic archbishops
Roman Catholic archbishops of Montevideo